Craig Edwards (born 23 December 1968) is a former professional snooker player who is most notable for reaching the first round of the 1991 World Snooker Championship.
Reached "Last 16" European Open, losing to Steve Davis 5–4.
Northern English Amateur Champion 1988
English Amateur Championship runner up 1988 to Barry Pinches

In 2007 he placed 282nd in $10,000 World Championship No Limit Holdem, 38th World Series of Poker

References

1968 births
Living people
English snooker players
Sportspeople from Nottingham